William Thomas (born 1885; date of death unknown) was an English footballer who played for Port Vale, Everton, Leeds City, Barnsley, and Huddersfield Town.

Career
Thomas played for Newcastle Swifts before joining Port Vale in June 1903. His debut came in an 8–1 defeat to Liverpool at Anfield on 8 April 1905, and he claimed his first goal in the Football League 13 days later in a 3–2 win over Gainsborough Trinity at the Athletic Ground. These were his only two appearances of the 1904–05 season. He played nine Second Division appearances in the 1905–06 season, before he moved on to Everton, Leeds City, Barnsley and Huddersfield Town.

Career statistics
Source:

References

1885 births
Year of death missing
Footballers from Liverpool
English footballers
Association football forwards
Port Vale F.C. players
Everton F.C. players
Leeds City F.C. players
Barnsley F.C. players
Huddersfield Town A.F.C. players
English Football League players